"Dieu m'a donné la foi" is a song by French singer Ophélie Winter. It was released as the lead single from her debut album, No Soucy !, in September 1995. It achieved success in France, where it topped the chart, and in Belgium's Wallonia region, where it peaked at number three. It remains Winter's biggest success.

The song has groove sonorities and is influenced by the negro spiritual. As the title suggests it, the lyrics deals with spirituality. The song was used in 1997 French film Bouge!, in which Winter portrays a singer, and performs the song in English-language under the title "Living in Me". This version was included on the English version of her album Soon.

Commercial performance
In France, "Dieu m'a donné la foi" debuted at number 49 on 18 November 1995 and reached the top 10 six weeks later. It eventually topped the French Singles Chart for a sole week, totalling 15 weeks in the top 10 and 32 weeks on the chart. It was certified gold by the Syndicat National de l'Édition Phonographique (SNEP). In the Wallonia region of Belgium, the single charted for 27 weeks and spent 16 weeks in the top 10, four of them at its peak of number three.

Track listings
CD single
 "Dieu m'a donné la foi" — 3:55
 "Everlasting Love" — 5:05

Charts

Weekly charts

Year-end charts

Certifications

References

1995 singles
French-language songs
SNEP Top Singles number-one singles
Ophélie Winter songs
1995 songs
East West Records singles